Oleksiy Pinchuk (born 17 February 1992 in Dnipropetrovsk, Ukraine) is a Ukrainian football midfielder who plays for Hirnyk-Sport Horishni Plavni.

Pinchuk is a product of the FC Dnipro youth sportive school. His first trainer was Hennadiy Tabala.

References

External links

Ukrainian footballers
Ukrainian expatriate footballers
FC Dnipro-75 Dnipropetrovsk players
FC Dnipro-2 Dnipropetrovsk players
FC Stal Kamianske players
Association football midfielders
1992 births
Living people
Footballers from Dnipro
FC Gandzasar Kapan players
Expatriate footballers in Armenia
Ukrainian expatriate sportspeople in Armenia
MFC Mykolaiv players
FC Hirnyk-Sport Horishni Plavni players
PFC Sumy players
FC Metalurh Zaporizhzhia players